The Delines are an American band from Portland, Oregon. Their original line-up was vocalist Amy Boone, Jenny Conlee (The Decemberists) on keyboards, Sean Oldham and Willy Vlautin (Richmond Fontaine) and pedal steel player Tucker Jackson (Minus 5). The band was formed in 2012 and is self-described as a "retro country band".

History
The Delines were formed when singer Amy Boone was touring with Richmond Fontaine and singing the female parts from that band's 2003 album, Post to Wire, which had been performed by her sister Deborah Kelly. Kelly and Boone had been in the Texas band the Damnations.  Vlautin then formed the Delines, centred on Boone's evocative world-weary and vulnerable vocals. They gathered in Portland, Oregon with producer John Askew to cut the band's debut album, Colfax. The songs on  Colfax, which was released in June 2014, combined Vlautin's admired lyrics about characters from America's hinterland and their everyday struggles, with Boone's vocals, the emotion of which wrings out the pain of the characters. Colfax was well received by the critics and scored 87 on Metacritic with seven positive reviews.

Following the release of Colfax the band embarked on a European tour. They have since toured in North America and Australasia, and returned to Europe. A second album, Scenic Sessions, was released as a limited edition CD for sale only on the 2015 European tour and from the band's website. This ten-song album had seven songs by Vlautin, a song written by Cory Gray and another by Amy Boone, as well as a cover of Sunshine by Sparklehorse. Amy Boone was involved in a car accident in March 2016 and the band planned to record again when she had recovered.

The band's second album, The Imperial, and a single from the album, "Eddie and Polly", were both released in January 2019. They also announced a European tour for the beginning of 2019. The Imperial was nearly as well received as their debut album, scoring 84 on Metacritic from six reviews.

Members
The current members of The Delines are:
 
Amy Boone – vocals, guitar 
Cory Gray – keyboards, trumpet 
Tucker Jackson – pedal steel 
Sean Oldham – percussion, vocals 
Freddy Trujillo – bass, vocals 
Willy Vlautin – guitar, vocals 
John Askew – baritone guitar

Discography
Colfax (2014)
Scenic Sessions (2015)
The Imperial (2019)
The Sea Drift (2022)

References

2012 establishments in Oregon
American alternative country groups
Musical groups established in 2012
Musical groups from Portland, Oregon